The Rutara peoples (endonym: Banyakitara, Abanyakitara) are a group of closely related Bantu ethnic groups native to the African Great Lakes region. They speak mutually intelligible dialects and include groups such as the Banyoro, Banyankore and Bahaya.

History
Proto-Rutara people originated in the Kagera Region of Tanzania near Bukoba in the year 700AD. They then expanded northwestwards spreading Rutara language and culture into western Uganda and eastern Democratic Republic of Congo, regions that would one day become Bunyoro, Mboga, Nkore, Mpororo, etc. This movement of ideas and practices is likely to have marked the inception of the eras of the Batembuzi and Bacwezi, a period only dimly and fabulously remembered in the later oral traditions, but one in which
the key political ideas and economic structures of the later kingdoms first began to be put into effect.

Notes

Bantu peoples
Ethnic groups in Uganda
Ethnic groups in Tanzania
Ethnic groups in the Democratic Republic of the Congo
Ethnic groups in Rwanda